Social parasitism or social parasite may refer to the following:

 Parasitism (social offense), a label for those deemed to contribute insufficiently to human society
 Social parasitism (biology),  interspecies relationship based on exploiting interactions between members of a social species
 "Social Parasite", a song by Alice in Chains from the album Music Bank

See also
Parasite (disambiguation)

Social science disambiguation pages